News 18 J&K-Ladakh-Himachal is an Indian television network that broadcasts in Urdu and is owned by Network 18 which is owned and operated by Reliance Industries. It was launched on 15 August 2001 by Media Baron Ramoji Rao. It is the first Urdu Language channel of India.

History
The Urdu language has long been an integral part of the cultural fabric of India. Some of the Bollywood film industry's legacies come from this language. It is one of the official languages of India.

Establishment
After identifying a lack of a channel that showcased the Urdu language, ETV Network started India's first Urdu language TV channel: ETV Urdu, on 15 August 2001. It now caters to a large section of Urdu speaking population in India. It also aims to target Pakistani viewers as Urdu is their national language. It is also available in Bangladesh, Sri Lanka, UAE, United States and UK. Main programming includes serials, debates on culturally and socially relevant subjects, dramas, news, religious and other infotainment programs.

Administration
News18 Urdu is India's  full-time Urdu News channel which relays news and programs 24 hours a day. It is owned by Network 18  which is owned and operated by Reliance Industries. To cater to the needs of Maharashtra, Karnataka, West Bengal, Andhra Pradesh and Telangana states audience, the News 18 management started regional bulletins.

Television channels and stations established in 2001
Television stations in Hyderabad
Urdu-language mass media
Urdu-language television channels in India
24-hour television news channels in India